Zanna intricata is a species of lantern bug in the family Fulgoridae''.

References

Species described in 1858
Fulgorinae